The Sola Fide Observatory is an astronomical observatory owned and operated by staff and volunteers from JC Hormel Nature Center. It is located 3 miles south of Austin, Minnesota.

In 2019 the observatory added a 10-foot x 60-foot concrete observing strip with 120-volt AC power poles and 3 separate concrete observing pads (no power).  The observatory's main scope is an 18" Starmaster fully-computerized Dobsonian telescope.

See also 
 List of astronomical observatories

References

 

Astronomical observatories in Minnesota
Education in Mower County, Minnesota
Buildings and structures in Mower County, Minnesota
Tourist attractions in Mower County, Minnesota